L(l)oyd King may refer to:

Lloyd King (puzzle designer)
Loyd King (born 1949), basketball player
Lloyd J. King (1906–1998), founder of grocery chain King Soopers